A sworn declaration (also called a sworn statement or a statement under penalty of perjury) is a document that recites facts pertinent to a legal proceeding. It is very similar to an affidavit but is not witnessed and sealed by an official such as a notary public. Instead, the person making the declaration signs a separate endorsement paragraph at the end of the document, stating that the declaration is made under penalty of perjury.

In legal proceedings, generally, facts that rely upon an individual's memory or knowledge are most reliably proven by having the person give testimony in court: he appears in person before a judge at a time and place known to other interested persons, swears that his testimony will be true, states his testimony so that all can hear it, and can be cross-examined by opposing parties. Generally, the written record of his testimony is taken down in written form by an official of the court, the court reporter.

Such a procedure, although maximizing fairness and the likelihood of obtaining the truth, is expensive, troublesome, and time-consuming. Therefore, in many instances, especially in preliminary or uncontested proceedings, a court allows testimonial evidence to be given in a document filed with the clerk of court. Traditionally, that has required an affidavit: the person must put his testimony into written form and then sign the document in front of an official, such as a notary public or clerk, swearing to the official that the contents of the document are true. The official then endorses the document and generally stamps it with an official seal. Such an affidavit has several advantages over simple signed testimony:  
 The person giving the testimony is subject to penalties if he has lied, usually the felony of perjury
 The official is able to see reason, which gives some assurance that the person is not suffering under a disqualifying disability
 The official is able to witness the signing of the document and check the proof of the affiant's identity, helping to prevent some forms of outright fraud.

In recent years, however, to provide for even greater economy of time and money, courts have increasingly allowed persons to omit the step of swearing before a notary public or official. Instead, the affiant puts a separate paragraph at the end of the document, such as the following (for United States federal courts):
I declare (or certify, verify, or state) under penalty of perjury that the foregoing is true and correct. Executed on (date). Where allowed, such an endorsement gives the document the same weight as an affidavit, per  The document is called a sworn declaration or sworn statement instead of an affidavit, and the maker is called a "declarant" rather than an "affiant", but other than this difference in terminology, the two are treated identically by the court.

A sworn declaration used in place of an affidavit must be specifically authorized by statute. The federal courts and a few states have general statutes allowing a sworn declaration in any matter where an affidavit can be used. In other cases, sworn statements are allowed for some purposes, but not others.

One drawback to the use of a sworn statement while the protection of liability for perjury is retained, the protection is lost of having an independent official witness the signing, check the affiant's identification, etc. That function is essentially taken over by the attorney for the party in whose favor the affidavit is given; the court relies upon the honesty of the attorney, or, perhaps more realistically, upon the attorney's fear of being disbarred, to guarantee that the declarant is competent to testify, is who he says he is, and has actually sworn to the truth of the facts stated. Another incentive for attorneys to make sure that the text of a declaration precisely matches the declarant's recollection is that the witness may be subject to impeachment at trial if discrepancies between the declaration and any later testimony turn out to be significant.

Another more practical drawback is the conservative nature of the law. Even if use of a sworn statement is fully authorized, another individual to the transaction, such as a party to a business transaction or another person's attorney, may be unacquainted with the form and refuse to accept it in lieu of a notarized affidavit.

See also 
 Affidavit
 Oath
 Statutory declaration

References

Legal documents